Seid Behram (born 12 July 1998) is a Bosnian professional footballer who plays as a midfielder.

Club career
Born in Mostar, Bosnia and Herzegovina, Behram started to play football at his hometown club Velež. As a youth player, he joined the youth academy of Bosnian giants Željezničar. Before the second half of the 2015–16 season, Behram joined the youth academy of English Championship club Reading, after trialing for Premier League side Everton. In 2016, he almost signed for Lille in the French Ligue 1, but the transfer never happened.

Before the second half of the 2016–17 season, Behram signed with Luxembourgish club Racing Union Luxembourg, but left due to problems with the new manager.

Before the second half of the 2017–18 season, he returned to Velež. On 25 May 2019, Behram won the First League of FBiH with Velež after the club beat Bosna Visoko and got promoted back to the Bosnian Premier League. He left the club in May 2021.

International career
Behram represented the Bosnia and Herzegovina U17 national team, earning 5 caps.

Honours
Velež Mostar
First League of FBiH: 2018–19

References

External links
Seid Behram at playmakerstats.com

1998 births
Living people
Sportspeople from Mostar
Bosnia and Herzegovina footballers
Bosnia and Herzegovina youth international footballers
Bosnia and Herzegovina expatriate sportspeople in England
Expatriate footballers in England
Bosnia and Herzegovina expatriate sportspeople in Luxembourg
Expatriate footballers in Luxembourg
First League of the Federation of Bosnia and Herzegovina players
Luxembourg National Division players
Premier League of Bosnia and Herzegovina players
FK Velež Mostar players
Racing FC Union Luxembourg players
Association football midfielders